Vexillum aureolineatum is a species of small sea snail, marine gastropod mollusk in the family Costellariidae, the ribbed miters.

Description
The length of the shell attains 20 mm.

Distribution
This marine species occurs off the Philippines.

References

 Turner, H. (1988). Vexillum (Costellaria) aureolineatum, a new costellarid species from the Western and Central Pacific Ocean (Mollusca: Neogastropoda). La Conchiglia. 19 (230-231): 8-10
 Marrow M.P. (2019). Seven new species of Vexillum (Gastropoda: Costellariidae) from Western Australia. Acta Conchyliorum. 19: 77-94.

aureolineatum
Gastropods described in 1988